Dobrush is a town in Gomel Region, Belarus. It is located on the Iput River. It is first mentioned in 1335.

Dobruh is governed by a Regional Executive Committee, the chairman of which is Volha Mokharava.

History 
On November 21, 1941, 106 local Jews and 19 Soviet activists were murdered in a mass execution perpetrated by Einsatzkommando 8, coming from Gomel, assisted by local policemen. During the spring of 1942, another execution took place in which about 70 Jews were also killed.

Mass media
The Dobrush Region newspaper is published in Dobrush.

Сulture
In Dobrush there are State Institution "Dobrush Regional Palace of Culture", GDK "Meliorator", Dobrush Public and Cultural Center. Also in Dobrush there is a regional children's library. Since 2002, the Dobrush Regional Museum of Local Lore has been operating. In addition to all this, the Voskhod Cinema (3D) operates in Dobrush.
On November 13, 2021, the regional qualifying round of the XIII Republican Festival of National Cultures was held in Dobrush.
In 2022, the 29th Day of Belarusian Writing will be held in Dobrush.

Gallery

References

External links
 Dobrush regional portal
 Dobrush Regional Executive Committee, in English 
 Photos at Radzima.org
 Photos at Globus.tut.by

Towns in Belarus
Populated places in Gomel Region
Minsk Voivodeship
Gomelsky Uyezd
Holocaust locations in Belarus